General Manners may refer to:

Lord Charles Manners (British Army officer, died 1761) (died 1761), British Army major general
Lord Charles Manners (British Army officer, born 1780) (1780–1855), British Army general
John Manners, Marquess of Granby (1721–1770), British Army lieutenant general
Lord Robert Manners (British Army officer, born 1781) (1781–1835), British Army major general
Lord Robert Manners (British Army officer, died 1782) (c. 1721–1782), British Army general
Robert Manners (British Army officer, born 1758) (1758–1823), British Army general
Russell Manners (British Army officer) (1736–1800), British Army general